Alice May Palmer (1886–1977) was a New Zealand public servant, union official and equal pay campaigner. She was born in Gordon, Southland, New Zealand in 1886.

References

1886 births
1977 deaths
New Zealand activists
New Zealand women activists
New Zealand public servants
People educated at Southland Girls' High School